is a private university in Hokuto, Yamanashi, Japan. The school was founded in April 1967 as a women's junior college. It became coeducational in 1990.

External links
 Official website 

Educational institutions established in 1967
Private universities and colleges in Japan
Universities and colleges in Yamanashi Prefecture
Japanese junior colleges
Hokuto, Yamanashi
1967 establishments in Japan